Eucalyptus dissimulata, commonly known as the red-capped mallee, is a species of mallee that is endemic to Western Australia. It has smooth greyish bark that is shed in strips, glossy green, narrow elliptic to narrow lance-shaped adult leaves, flower buds in groups of between seven and eleven, creamy white flowers and short cylindrical to stubby barrel-shaped fruit.

Description
It has smooth light grey to greenish brown bark that is shed in strips. Flowering occurs between October and March and the flowers are creamy white. The seeds are brown-grey and a flattened oval shape.

Taxonomy and naming
The specific epithet (dissimulata) is a Latin word meaning "pretending", referring to the superficial similarity of this species to E. albida.

This species is part of the Eucalyptus subgenus Symphyomyrtus in the section Bisectae and the subsection Destitutae.

Distribution and habitat
Red-capped mallee is found on sand-plains and near creeks, along a narrow, near-coastal strip in the Wheatbelt and Goldfields-Esperance regions between Corrigin and Munglinup where it grows in sandy-loamy soils.

Conservation status
Eucalyptus dissimulata is classified as "not threatened" by the Western Australian Government Department of Parks and Wildlife.

See also
List of Eucalyptus species

References

Eucalypts of Western Australia
dissimulata
Myrtales of Australia
Plants described in 1988
Taxa named by Ian Brooker